The 1935–36 season was Aberdeen's 31st season in the top flight of Scottish football and their 32nd season overall. Aberdeen competed in the Scottish League Division One and the Scottish Cup.

Results

Division One

Final standings

Scottish Cup

References

AFC Heritage Trust

Aberdeen F.C. seasons
Aber